A mechanical network is an abstract interconnection of mechanical elements along the lines of an electrical circuit diagram.  Elements include rigid bodies, springs, dampers, transmissions, and actuators.

Network symbols

The symbols from left to right are: stiffness element (e.g. spring), mass (rigid body), mechanical resistance (e.g. damper), force generator, velocity generator.  The symbols for generators depend on which mechanical–electrical analogy is being used.  The symbols shown relate to the impedance analogy.  In the mobility analogy the symbols are reversed, being respectively velocity and force generators.

See also
 Multibody system

Machines